Constituency NA-126 (Lahore-IX) is a constituency for the National Assembly of Pakistan. After the 2018 delimitations, its areas have been divided among NA-130 (Lahore-VIII) and NA-135 (Lahore-XIII).

Boundaries 
NA-126 included the areas of Model Town, Gulberg, Makkah Colony, Naseerabad, Shah Kamal, Pakki Thatthi, Kashmir Block, Rehmanpura, Gulshan Iqbal, Ravi Block, Sikandar Block, Awan Town, Garden Town, Model Town, Township, Liberty, Ferozepur Road, Kalma Chowk, Faisal Town, Wafaqi Colony, Allama Iqbal Town, Wahdat Colony, Najaf Colony, Punjab University New Campus, Muslim Town and parts of Johar Town.

Election 2002 

General elections were held on 10 Oct 2002. Liaqat Baloch of Muttahida Majlis-e-Amal won by 45,679 votes and Dr Shahid Siddique (PTI) came second with 13957 votes.

Election 2008 

General elections were held on 18 Feb 2008. Umar Sohail Zia Butt of PML-N won by 69,718 votes.

Election 2013 

General elections were held on 11 May 2013. Shafqat Mahmood of Pakistan tehreek insaf won by 97,785 votes and became the  member of National Assembly.

References

External links 
 Election result's official website

NA-126
Abolished National Assembly Constituencies of Pakistan